IKEA (US and ) is a Swedish multinational conglomerate based in the Netherlands that designs and sells , kitchen appliances, decoration, home accessories, and various other goods and home services. Started in 1943 by Ingvar Kamprad, IKEA has been the world's largest furniture retailer since 2008. The brand used by the group is derived from an acronym that consists of the founder's initials, and those of Elmtaryd, the family farm where he was born, and the nearby village Agunnaryd (his hometown in Småland, southern Sweden).

The group is primarily known for its modernist designs for various types of appliances and furniture, and its interior design work is often associated with simplicity. In addition, the firm is known for its attention to cost control, operational details, and continuous product development that has allowed IKEA to lower its prices by an average of two to three percent.

, there are 422 IKEA stores operating in 50 countries and in fiscal year 2018, €38.8billion (US$44.6billion) worth of IKEA goods were sold. For multiple reasons, including lowering taxes payable, IKEA uses a complicated corporate structure. Within this structure, all IKEA stores are operated under franchise from Inter IKEA Systems B.V. which handles branding, design, manufacturing, and supply. Another part of the IKEA group, Ingka Group, operates the majority of IKEA stores as a franchisee and pays royalties to Inter IKEA Systems B.V. Some IKEA stores are also operated by independent franchisees.

The IKEA website contains about 12,000 products and there were over 2.1billion visitors to IKEA's websites in the year from September 2015 to August 2016.

The group is responsible for approximately 1% of world commercial-product wood consumption, making it one of the largest users of wood in the retail sector. IKEA claims to use 99.5% recycled or FSC-certified wood. However, IKEA has been shown to be involved in unsustainable and most likely illegal logging of old-growth and protected forests in multiple Eastern European countries in recent years.

History

In 1943, then-17-year-old Ingvar Kamprad founded IKEA as a mail-order sales business, and began to sell furniture five years later. The first store was opened in Älmhult, Småland, in 1958, under the name Möbel-IKÉA (Möbel means "furniture" in Swedish). The first stores outside Sweden were opened in Norway (1963) and Denmark (1969). The stores spread to other parts of Europe in the 1970s, with the first store outside Scandinavia opening in Switzerland (1973), followed by West Germany (1974), Japan (1974), Australia, Canada (1975), Hong Kong (1975), Singapore and the Netherlands (1978). IKEA further expanded in the 1980s, opening stores in countries such as France and Spain (1981), Belgium (1984), the United States (1985), the United Kingdom (1987), and Italy (1989). Germany, with 53 stores, is IKEA's biggest market, followed by the United States, with 51 stores.

IKEA entered Latin America in February 2010, opening in the Dominican Republic. As for the region's largest markets, on 8 April 2021, a store was opened in Mexico City.
In August 2018, IKEA opened its first store in India, in Hyderabad.

On 10 August 2022, IKEA opened its first store in Chile. This is its the first store in South America. Another store is expected to open in Colombia by 2023, soon to be followed by a store in Peru.

In March 2022, IKEA announced the closing of all 17 stores in Russia, resulting from the 2022 Russian invasion of Ukraine, the first market in which they suspended business. However, Ingka also owns 14 shopping centers across Russia operating under its Mega brand. These will remain open. Due to the ongoing war and unimproved situation in Russia, IKEA said on 15 June that it would sell factories, close offices and reduce its work force. Later it became known that IKEA does not plan to sell its business, but expects to return to Russia within two years. About 700 people will continue to work for the company during this period. By October 2022, IKEA laid off about 10,000 Russian employees.

IKEA was hit hard by COVID-19 due to lockdown in various countries, like in the UK and Canada. Because demand had fallen, its annual catalogue ceased publication after 70 years in print. The prices of their products have risen significantly in 2022 due to rising costs and inflation. In April 2022, IKEA has shut down one of its stores in Guiyang when sales took a significant hit from the pandemic. Due to strict COVID-19 lockdowns in China, IKEA is considering closing another store in Shanghai by July 2022. IKEA is also facing stock shortages and shipping problems that may continue until the end of 2022.

First store opening in each location

1 then British Hong Kong, 2 then part of Czechoslovakia, 3 then part of Yugoslavia

Store layout

Traditional store layout
IKEA stores are typically blue buildings with yellow accents (also Sweden's national colours). They are often designed in a one-way layout, leading customers counter-clockwise along what IKEA calls "the long natural way" designed to encourage the customer to see the store in its entirety (as opposed to a traditional retail store, which allows a customer to go directly to the section where the desired goods and services are displayed). There are often shortcuts to other parts of the showroom.

The sequence first involves going through the furniture showrooms making note of selected items. The customer collects a shopping cart and proceeds to an open-shelf "Market Hall" warehouse for smaller items, visits the self-service furniture warehouse to collect previously noted showroom products in flat pack form. Sometimes, they are directed to collect products from an external warehouse on the same site or at a site nearby after purchase. Finally, customers pay for their products at a cash register. Not all furniture is stocked at the store level, such as particular sofa colours needing to be shipped from a warehouse to the customer's home or the store.

Most stores follow the layout of having the showroom upstairs with the marketplace and self-service warehouse downstairs. Some stores are single level, while others have separate warehouses to allow more stock to be kept on-site. Single-level stores are found predominantly in areas where the cost of land would be less than the cost of building a 2-level store. Some stores have dual-level warehouses with machine-controlled silos to allow large quantities of stock to be accessed throughout the selling day.

Most IKEA stores offer an "as-is" or “bargain corner” (recently rebranded as “circular hub”) area at the end of the warehouse, just before the cash registers. Returned, damaged, and formerly showcased products are displayed here and sold with a significant discount.

Alternative smaller store formats

The vast majority of IKEA stores are located outside of city centers, primarily because of land cost and traffic access.

New formats for full-size stores
A new format for a full-size, city center store was introduced with the opening of the Manchester (United Kingdom) store, situated in Ashton-under-Lyne in 2006. Another store, in Coventry, opened in December 2007.  The store had seven floors and a different flow from other IKEA stores; however, it closed down in 2020 due to the site being deemed unsuitable for future business. IKEA's Southampton store that opened in February 2009 is also in the city center and built in an urban style similar to the Coventry store.  IKEA built these stores in response to UK government restrictions blocking retail establishment outside city centers.

Adaptation to Japanese market
Japan was another market where IKEA performed badly initially, exited the market completely and then re-entered the Japanese market with an alternative store design and layout with which it finally found success. The IKEA entered the Japanese market in 1974 through a franchise arrangement with a local partner, only to withdraw in failure in 1986. Japan was one of the first markets outside its original core European market. Despite Japan being the second largest economy in the world at the time, IKEA did not adequately adapt its store layout strategy to the Japanese consumer. Japanese consumers did not have a culture of DIY furniture assembly, and many in the early days had no way to haul the flat-packs home to their small apartments. Nor did the store layouts familiar to European customers initially make much sense to Japanese consumers. So prior to re-entering the Japanese market in 2006, IKEA management did extensive local market research in more effective store layouts.  One area of local adaptation was the room displays common to every IKEA store worldwide. Rather than just replicate a typical European room layout, the IKEA Japan management was careful to set up room displays more closely resembling Japanese apartment rooms, such as one for "a typical Japanese teenage boy who likes baseball and computer games".

Inner-city stores
IKEA also adapted its store location and services to the 'inner-city' format for the expansion in China, unlike other countries where IKEA stores for economic and planning restriction reasons tends to be more commonly just outside city centers due to planning restrictions. In China, planning restrictions are less of an issue than in other country markets due to the lack of cars for much of its customer base.  Accordingly, in store design alternatives, IKEA has had to offer store locations and formats closer to public transportation since few customers had access to cars with which to buy and take-home DIY flat pack furniture. The store design alternative thinking and strategy in China has been to locate stores to facilitate access for non-car owning customers. In fact, in some locations in China, IKEA stores can be found not in the usual suburban or near airport locations like in other countries, but rather places such as downtown shopping center with a 'mini-IKEA' store to attract shoppers. For example, one store design alternative trend that IKEA has implemented has been 'pop-up' stores along social media platforms in their advertising strategy for the first-time as a company to reach new customers demographics while still reinforcing its global brand locally in China.

Small sized stores
In Hong Kong, where shop space is limited and costly, IKEA has opened three outlets in the city, most of which have the one-way layout, part of shopping malls, small for IKEA stores but huge for Hong Kong retail stores. In addition to tailoring store sizes for specific countries, IKEA also alters the sizes of their products in order to accommodate cultural differences.

In 2015, IKEA announced that it would be attempting a smaller store design at several locations in Canada. This modified store will feature only a display gallery and a small warehouse. One location planned for Kitchener is in the place formerly occupied by a Sears Home store. The warehouses will not keep furniture stocked, and so customers will not be able to drop in to purchase and leave with furniture the same day.  Instead, they will purchase the furniture in advance online or in-store and order the furniture delivered to one of the new stores, for a greatly reduced rate. IKEA claims that this new model will allow them to expand quickly into new markets rather than spending years opening a full-size store.

It also opened at 360 Mall in Kuwait and in Harajuku, Tokyo at the same year.

In 2021, IKEA opened another of its smallest stores at the JEM Mall in Jurong East, Singapore. Also on the same year, IKEA opened its first small-store format in Bali, Indonesia.

Products and services

Furniture and homeware

Rather than being sold pre-assembled, much of IKEA's furniture is designed to be assembled by the customer. The company claims that this helps reduce costs and use of packaging by not shipping air; the volume of a bookcase, for example, is considerably less if it is shipped unassembled rather than assembled. This is also more practical for European customers using public transport, because flat packs can be more easily carried.

IKEA contends that it has been a pioneering force in sustainable approaches to mass consumer culture. Kamprad calls this "democratic design", meaning that the company applies an integrated approach to manufacturing and design (see also environmental design). In response to the explosion of human population and material expectations in the 20th and 21st centuries, the company implements economies of scale, capturing material streams and creating manufacturing processes that hold costs and resource use down, such as the extensive use of medium-density fibreboard ("MDF"), also called "particle board".

Notable items of IKEA furniture include the Poäng armchair, the Billy bookcase and the Klippan sofa, all of which have sold by the tens of millions since the late 1970s.

The IKEA and LEGO brands teamed up to create a range of simple storage solutions for children and adults.

In June 2021, IKEA Canada unveiled a series of 10 "Love Seats" inspired by different Pride flags, created by four LGBTQ designers.

Furniture and product naming
IKEA products are identified by one-word (rarely two-word) names. Most of the names are Scandinavian in origin. Although there are some exceptions, most product names are based on a special naming system developed by IKEA. Company founder Kamprad was dyslexic and found that naming the furniture with proper names and words, rather than a product code, made the names easier to remember.

Some of IKEA's Swedish product names have amusing or unfortunate connotations in other languages, sometimes resulting in the names being withdrawn in certain countries. Notable examples for English include the "Jerker" computer desk (discontinued several years ago ), "Fukta" plant spray, "Fartfull" workbench, and "Lyckhem" (meaning bliss).

Due to several products being named after real locations, this has resulted in some locations sharing names with objects considered generally unpleasant, such as a toilet brush being named after the lake of Bolmen and a trash can named after the village of Toften. In November 2021, Visit Sweden launched a jocular campaign named "Discover the Originals", which invites tourists to visit the locations which have received such unfortunate associations with such items.

Design services

During the COVID-19 pandemic in 2020, to facilitate social distancing between customers and accommodate the increased volume of customers who were booking IKEA design consultation services, IKEA stores in Saudi Arabia and Bahrain improved their design consulting process by piloting Ombori's paperless queue management system for the brand.

In March 2021, IKEA launched IKEA Studio in partnership with Apple Inc., an app enabling customers to design full-scale rooms with IKEA furniture using augmented reality on an iPhone.

Smart home
In 2016, IKEA started a move into the smart home business. The IKEA TRÅDFRI smart lighting kit was one of the first ranges signalling this change. IKEA's media team has confirmed that smart home project will be a big move. They have also started a partnership with Philips Hue. The wireless charging furniture, integrating wireless Qi charging into everyday furniture, is another strategy for the smart home business.

A collaboration to build Sonos smart speaker technology into furniture sold by IKEA was announced in December 2017. The first products resulting from the collaboration launched in August 2019.

Under the product name SYMFONISK, IKEA and Sonos have made two distinct wireless speakers that integrate with existing Sonos households or can be used to start with the Sonos-ecosystem, one that's also a lamp and another that's a more traditional looking bookshelf speaker. Both products as well as accessories for the purpose of mounting the bookshelf speakers have gone on sale worldwide on 1 August.

From the start, IKEA SYMFONISK can only be controlled from the Sonos app, but IKEA will add support for the speakers in their own Home Smart app in October  to be paired with scenes that control both the lights and smart blinds together with the speakers.

Houses and flats
IKEA has also expanded its product base to include flat-pack houses and apartments, in an effort to cut prices involved in a first-time buyer's home. The IKEA product, named BoKlok was launched in Sweden in 1996 in a joint venture with Skanska. Now working in the Nordic countries and in the UK, sites confirmed in England include London, Ashton-under-Lyne, Leeds, Gateshead, Warrington, Bristol and Liverpool.

Solar PV systems
At the end of September 2013, the company announced that solar panel packages, so-called "residential kits", for houses will be sold at 17 UK stores by mid-2014. The decision followed a successful pilot project at the Lakeside IKEA store, whereby one photovoltaic system was sold almost every day. The solar CIGS panels are manufactured by Solibro, a German-based subsidiary of the Chinese company Hanergy. By the end of 2014, IKEA began to sell Solibro's solar residential kits in the Netherlands and in Switzerland. In November 2015, IKEA ended its contract with Hanergy and in April 2016 started working with Solarcentury to sell solar panels in the United Kingdom. The deal would allow customers to be able to order panels online and at three stores before being expanded to all United Kingdom stores by the end of summer.

Furniture rental
In April 2019, the company announced that it would begin test marketing a new concept, renting furniture to customers. One of the motivating factors was the fact that inexpensive IKEA products were viewed as "disposable" and often ended up being scrapped after a few years of use. This was at a time when especially younger buyers said they wanted to minimize their impact on the environment. The company understood this view. In an interview, Jesper Brodin, the chief executive of Ingka Group (the largest franchisee of IKEA stores), commented that "climate change and unsustainable consumption are among the biggest challenges we face in society". The other strategic objectives of the plan were to be more affordable and more convenient. The company said it would test the rental concept in all 30 markets by 2020, expecting it to increase the number of times a piece of furniture would be used before recycling.

Restaurant and food markets

The first IKEA store opened in 1958 with a small cafe that transitioned into a full-blown restaurant in 1960 that, until 2011, sold branded Swedish prepared specialist foods, such as meatballs, packages of gravy, lingonberry jam, various biscuits and crackers, and salmon and fish roe spread. The new label has a variety of items including chocolates, meatballs, jams, pancakes, salmon and  various drinks.

Although the cafes primarily serve Swedish food, the menu varies based on the culture, food and location of each store. With restaurants in 38 countries, the menu will incorporate local dishes including shawarma in Saudi Arabia, poutine in Canada, macarons in France, and gelato in Italy. In Indonesia, the Swedish meatballs recipe is changed to accommodate the country's halal requirements. Stores in Israel sell kosher food under rabbinical supervision. The kosher restaurants are separated into dairy and meat areas.

In many locations, the IKEA restaurants open daily before the rest of the store and serve breakfast. All food products are based on Swedish recipes and traditions. Food accounts for 5% of IKEA's sales.

IKEA sells plant-based meatballs made from potatoes, apples, pea protein, and oats in all of its stores. According to United States journalist Avery Yale Kamila, IKEA began testing its plant-based meatballs in 2014, then launched the plant-based meatballs in 2015 and began testing vegan hot dogs in 2018. In 2019, journalist James Hansen reported in Eater London that IKEA would only sell vegetarian food at Christmastime.

Småland
Every store has a kids play area, named Småland (Swedish for small lands; it is also the Swedish province of Småland where founder Kamprad was born). Parents drop off their children at a gate to the playground, and pick them up after they arrive at another entrance. In some stores, parents are given free pagers by the on-site staff, which the staff can use to summon parents whose children need them earlier than expected; in others, staff summon parents through announcements over the in-store public address system or by calling them on their cellphones. The largest Småland play area is located at the IKEA store in Navi Mumbai, India. Some of these were closed down due to pandemic.

Other ventures

IKEA owns & operates the MEGA Family Shopping Centre chain in Russia.

On 8 August 2008, IKEA UK launched a virtual mobile phone network called IKEA Family Mobile, which ran on T-Mobile. At launch it was the cheapest pay-as-you-go network in the UK. In June 2015 the network announced that its services would cease to operate from 31 August 2015.

, IKEA has a joint venture with TCL to provide Uppleva integrated HDTV and entertainment system products.

In mid-August 2012, the company announced that it would establish a chain of 100 economy hotels in Europe but, unlike its few existing hotels in Scandinavia, they would not carry the IKEA name, nor would they use IKEA furniture and furnishings – they would be operated by an unnamed international group of hoteliers. As of 30 April 2018, however, the company owned only a single hotel, the IKEA Hotell in  Älmhult, Sweden.

It was previously planning to open another one, in New Haven, Connecticut, United States, after converting the historic Pirelli Building. The company received approval for the concept from the city's planning commission in mid-November 2018; the building was to include 165 rooms and the property would offer 129 dedicated parking spaces. Research in April 2019 provided no indication that the hotel had been completed as of that time. The building was then sold to Connecticut architect and developer Becker + Becker for $1.2million. Opening in 2022 under Hotel Marcel, it will be managed by Chesapeake Hospitality and became part of Hilton's Tapestry Collection.

From 2016 to 2018, IKEA made the Saladda belt-driven bicycle.

In September 2017, IKEA announced they would be acquiring San Francisco-based TaskRabbit. The deal, completed later that year, has TaskRabbit operating as an independent company.

In March 2020, IKEA announced that it had partnered with Pizza Hut Hong Kong on a joint venture. IKEA launched a new side table called SÄVA. The table, designed to resemble a pizza saver, would be boxed in packaging resembling a pizza box, and the building instructions included a suggestion to order a Swedish meatball pizza from Pizza Hut, which would contain the same meatballs served in IKEA restaurants.

In April 2020, IKEA acquired AI imaging startup Geomagical Labs.

In July 2020, IKEA opened a concept store in the Harajuku district of Tokyo, Japan, where it launched its first ever apparel line.

Both malls are expected to open by 2025.

Corporate structure

IKEA is owned and operated by a complicated array of not-for-profit and for-profit corporations. The corporate structure is divided into two main parts: operations and franchising.

INGKA Holding B.V., based in the Netherlands, owns the Ingka Group, which takes care of the centers, retails, customer fulfillment, and all the other services related to IKEA products. The IKEA brand is owned and managed by Inter IKEA Systems B.V., based in the Netherlands, owned by Inter IKEA Holding B.V. Inter IKEA Holding is also in charge of design, manufacturing and supply of IKEA products.

Inter IKEA Systems is owned by Inter IKEA Holding BV, a company registered in the Netherlands, formerly registered in Luxembourg (under the name Inter IKEA Holding SA). Inter IKEA Holding, in turn, is owned by the Interogo Foundation, based in Liechtenstein. In 2016, the INGKA Holding sold its design, manufacturing and logistics subsidiaries to Inter IKEA Holding.

In June 2013, Ingvar Kamprad resigned from the board of Inter IKEA Holding SA and his youngest son Mathias Kamprad replaced Per Ludvigsson as the chairman of the holding company. Following his decision to step down, the 87-year-old founder explained, "I see this as a good time for me to leave the board of Inter IKEA Group. By that we are also taking another step in the generation shift that has been ongoing for some years." After the 2016 company restructure, Inter IKEA Holding SA no longer exists, having reincorporated in the Netherlands. Mathias Kamprad became a board member of the Inter IKEA Group and the Interogo Foundation. Mathias and his two older brothers, who also have leadership roles at IKEA, work on the corporation's overall vision and long-term strategy.

Control by Kamprad

Along with helping IKEA make a non-taxable profit, IKEA's complicated corporate structure allowed Kamprad to maintain tight control over the operations of INGKA Holding, and thus the operation of most IKEA stores. The INGKA Foundation's five-person executive committee was chaired by Kamprad. It appoints a board of INGKA Holding, approves any changes to INGKA Holding's bylaws, and has the right to preempt new share issues. If a member of the executive committee quits or dies, the other four members appoint their replacement.

In Kamprad's absence, the foundation's bylaws include specific provisions requiring it to continue operating the INGKA Holding group and specifying that shares can be sold only to another foundation with the same objectives as the INGKA Foundation.

Financial information

The net profit of IKEA Group (which does not include Inter IKEA systems) in fiscal year 2009 (after paying franchise fees to Inter IKEA systems) was €2.538billion on sales of €21.846billion. Because INGKA Holding is owned by the non-profit INGKA Foundation, none of this profit is taxed. The foundation's nonprofit status also means that the Kamprad family cannot reap these profits directly, but the Kamprads do collect a portion of IKEA sales profits through the franchising relationship between INGKA Holding and Inter IKEA Systems.

As a franchisee, the Ingka Group pays 3% of royalties to Inter IKEA Systems. Inter IKEA Systems collected €631million of franchise fees in 2004 but reported pre-tax profits of only €225million in 2004. One of the major pre-tax expenses that Inter IKEA systems reported was €590million of "other operating charges". IKEA has refused to explain these charges, but Inter IKEA Systems appears to make large payments to I.I. Holding, another Luxembourg-registered group that, according to The Economist, "is almost certain to be controlled by the Kamprad family". I.I. Holding made a profit of €328million in 2004.

In 2004, the Inter IKEA group of companies and I.I. Holding reported combined profits of €553m and paid €19m in taxes, or approximately 3.5 percent.

Public Eye, a non-profit organisation in Switzerland that promotes corporate responsibility, has formally criticised IKEA for its tax avoidance strategies. In 2007, the organisation nominated IKEA for one of its Public Eye "awards", which highlight corporate irresponsibility.

In February 2016, the Greens / EFA group in the European Parliament issued a report entitled IKEA: Flat Pack Tax Avoidance on the tax planning strategies of IKEA and their possible use to avoid tax in several European countries. The report was sent to Pierre Moscovici, the European Commissioner for Economic and Financial Affairs, Taxation and Customs, and Margrethe Vestager, the European Commissioner for Competition, expressing the hope that it would be of use to them in their respective roles "to advance the fight for tax justice in Europe".

Manufacturing, logistics, and labour
Although IKEA household products and furniture are designed in Sweden, they are largely manufactured in developing countries to keep costs down. For most of its products, the final assembly is performed by the end-user (consumer).

Swedwood, an IKEA subsidiary, handles production of all of the company's wood-based products, with the largest Swedwood factory located in Southern Poland. According to the subsidiary, over 16,000 employees across 50 sites in 10 countries manufacture the 100million pieces of furniture that IKEA sells annually. IKEA furniture uses the hardwood alternative particle board. Hultsfred, a factory in southern Sweden, is the company's sole supplier.

Distribution center efficiency and flexibility have been one of IKEA's ongoing priorities and thus it has implemented automated, robotic warehouse systems and warehouse management systems (WMS). Such systems facilitate a merger of the traditional retail and mail order sales channels into an omni-channel fulfillment model. In 2020, Ikea was noted by Supply Chain magazine as having one of the most automated warehouse systems in the world.

2021 supply chain problems 
Due to the COVID-19 pandemic, IKEA has been facing major supply chain issues since 2021, which could extend into 2022. Jon Abrahamsson, the chief executive of Inter IKEA has stated that the main issue is shipping products from China, as a "quarter" of IKEA products are made there. A variety of reasons led to supply shortages, including consumption shocks. In addition, factories were unable to produce raw materials and workers even after they began receiving orders.

Labour practices
During the 1980s, IKEA kept its costs down by using production facilities in East Germany. A portion of the workforce at those factories consisted of political prisoners. This fact, revealed in a report by Ernst & Young commissioned by the company, resulted from the intermingling of criminals and political dissidents in the state-owned production facilities IKEA contracted with, a practice which was generally known in West Germany. IKEA was one of a number of companies, including West German firms, which benefited from this practice. The investigation resulted from attempts by former political prisoners to obtain compensation. In November 2012, IKEA admitted being aware at the time of the possibility of use of forced labor and failing to exercise sufficient control to identify and avoid it. A summary of the Ernst & Young report was released on 16 November 2012.

In 2018, Ikea was accused of union busting when employees sought to organize, using such tactics as captive audience meetings.

IKEA was named one of the 100 Best Companies for Working Mothers in 2004 and 2005 by Working Mothers magazine. It ranked 80 in Fortune's 200 Best Companies to Work For in 2006 and in October 2008, IKEA Canada LP was named one of "Canada's Top 100 Employers" by Mediacorp Canada Inc.

Environmental initiatives

Umbrella initiatives
After initial environmental issues like the highly publicized formaldehyde scandals in the early 1980s and 1992, IKEA took a proactive stance on environmental issues and tried to prevent future incidents through a variety of measures. In 1990, IKEA invited Karl-Henrik Robèrt, founder of the Natural Step, to address its board of directors. Robert's system conditions for sustainability provided a strategic approach to improving the company's environmental performance. In 1990, IKEA adopted the Natural Step framework as the basis for its environmental plan. This led to the development of an Environmental Action Plan, which was adopted in 1992. The plan focused on structural change, allowing IKEA to "maximize the impact of resources invested and reduce the energy necessary to address isolated issues." The environmental measures taken include the following:

 Replacing polyvinylchloride (PVC) in wallpapers, home textiles, shower curtains, lampshades and furniture—PVC has been eliminated from packaging and is being phased out in electric cables;
 Minimizing the use of formaldehyde in its products, including textiles;
 Eliminating acid-curing lacquers;
 Producing a model of chair (OGLA) made from 100% post-consumer plastic waste;
 Introducing a series of air-inflatable furniture products into the product line. Such products reduce the use of raw materials for framing and stuffing and reduce transportation weight and volume to about 15% of that of conventional furniture;
 Reducing the use of chromium for metal surface treatment;
 Limiting the use of substances such as cadmium, lead, PCB, PCP, and Azo pigments;
 Using wood from responsibly managed forests that replant and maintain biological diversity;
 Using only recyclable materials for flat packaging and "pure" (non-mixed) materials for packaging to assist in recycling.
 Introducing rental bicycles with trailers for customers in Denmark.

In 2000, IKEA introduced its code of conduct for suppliers that covers social, safety, and environmental questions. Today IKEA has around 60 auditors who perform hundreds of supplier audits every year. The main purpose of these audits is to make sure that the IKEA suppliers follow the law in each country where they are based. Most IKEA suppliers fulfil the law today with exceptions for some special issues, one being excessive working hours in Asia, in countries such as China and India.

, IKEA has signed on with 25 other companies to participate in the British Retail Consortium's Better Retail Better World initiative, which challenges companies to meet objectives outlined by the United Nations Sustainable Development Goals.

Product life cycle
To make IKEA a more sustainable company, a product life cycle was created. For the idea stage, products should be flat-packed so that more items can be shipped at once; products should also be easier to dismantle and recycle. Raw materials are used, and since wood and cotton are two of IKEA's most important manufacturing products, the company works with environmentally friendly forests and cotton, whereby the excessive use of chemicals and water is avoided.

IKEA stores recycle waste and many run on renewable energy. All employees are trained in environmental and social responsibility, while public transit is one of the priorities when the location of stores is considered. Also, the coffee and chocolate served at IKEA stores is UTZ Certified.

The last stage of the life cycle is the end of life. Most IKEA stores recycle light bulbs and drained batteries, and the company is also exploring the recycling of sofas and other home furnishing products.

Energy sources
On 17 February 2011, IKEA announced its plans to develop a wind farm in Dalarna County, Sweden, furthering its goal of using only renewable energy to fuel its operations. , 17 United States IKEA stores are powered by solar panels, with 22 additional installations in progress, and IKEA owns the 165 MW Cameron Wind farm in Cameron County on the South Texas coast and a 42 MW coastal wind farm in Finland.

In September 2019, IKEA announced that they would be investing $2.8billion in renewable energy infrastructure. The company is targeting making their entire supply chain climate positive by 2030.

Sourcing of wood
Reportedly, IKEA is the world's largest buyer and retailer of wood. In 2015, IKEA claimed to use 1% of world's supply of timber.

According to IKEA's 2021 Sustainability Report, 99.5% of all wood that the company uses is either recycled or meets the standards of the Forest Stewardship Council. IKEA states that "[a]ll wood used for IKEA products must meet our critical requirements that ensure it's not (e.g.) sourced from illegally harvested forests [...]". However, despite these claims, IKEA has been involved in unsustainable and most likely illegal logging of wood in multiple Eastern European countries in recent years, see Criticism of IKEA.

IKEA owns about 136,000 acres of forest in USA and about 450,000 acres in Europe.

On 14 January 2021, IKEA announced that Ingka Investments had acquired approximately 10,840 acres (4,386 hectares) near the Altamaha River Basin in Georgia from The Conservation Fund. The acquisition comes with the agreement "to protect the land from fragmentation, restore the longleaf pine forest, and safe-guard the habitat of the gopher tortoise."

IKEA is reported to be the largest private landowner in Romania since 2015.

Use of wood
In 2011, the company examined its wood consumption and noticed that almost half of its global pine and spruce consumption was for the fabrication of pallets. The company consequently started a transition to the use of paper pallets and the "Optiledge system". The OptiLedge product is totally recyclable, made from 100% virgin high-impact copolymer polypropylene (PP). The system is a "unit load alternative to the use of a pallet. The system consists of the OptiLedge (usually used in pairs), aligned and strapped to the bottom carton to form a base layer upon which to stack more products. Corner boards are used when strapping to minimize the potential for package compression." The conversion began in Germany and Japan, before its introduction into the rest of Europe and North America. The system has been marketed to other companies, and IKEA has formed the OptiLedge company to manage and sell the product.

Packaging and bags
Since March 2013, IKEA has stopped providing plastic bags to customers, but offers reusable bags for sale. The IKEA restaurants also only offer reusable plates, knives, forks, spoons, etc. Toilets in some IKEA WC-rooms have been outfitted with dual-function flushers. IKEA has recycling bins for compact fluorescent lamps (CFLs), energy-saving bulbs, and batteries.

In 2001, IKEA was one of the first companies to operate its own cross-border goods trains through several countries in Europe.

Electric vehicles
IKEA has expanded its sustainability plan in the UK to include electric car charge points for customers at all locations by the end of 2013. The effort will include Nissan and Ecotricity and promise to deliver an 80% charge in 30 minutes.

From 2016, IKEA has only sold energy-efficient LED lightbulbs, lamps and light fixtures. LED lightbulbs use as little as 15% of the power of a regular incandescent light bulb.

Investments
In August 2008, IKEA  announced that it had created IKEA GreenTech, a €50million venture capital fund. Located in Lund (a university town in Sweden), it will invest in 8–10 companies in the coming five years with focus on solar panels, alternative light sources, product materials, energy efficiency and water saving and purification. The aim is to commercialise green technologies for sale in IKEA stores within 3–4 years.

In the 1980s under the rule of the genocidal romanian Communist Dictator Nicolae Ceaușescu, Romania's secret police the 'Securitate' received six-figure payments from Ikea. According to declassified files at the National College for Studying the Securitate Archives, Ikea agreed to overcharge for products made in Romania and some of the overpayment funds were deposited into an account controlled by the Securitate.

Donations made by IKEA
The INGKA Foundation is officially dedicated to promoting "innovations in architecture and interior design". The net worth of the foundation exceeded the net worth of the much better known Bill & Melinda Gates Foundation (now the largest private foundation in the world) for a period. However, most of the Group's profit is spent on investment.

IKEA is involved in several international charitable causes, particularly in partnership with UNICEF, including:
 In the wake of the 2004 Indian Ocean earthquake and tsunami, IKEA Australia agreed to match dollar for dollar co-workers' donations and donated all sales of the IKEA Blue Bag to the cause.
 After the 2005 Kashmir earthquake, IKEA gave 500,000 blankets to the relief effort in the region.
 IKEA has provided furniture for over 100 "bridge schools" in Liberia.
 In the 2008 Sichuan earthquake in China, IKEA Beijing sold an alligator toy for 40 yuan (US$5.83, £9.10, €3.70) with all income going to the children in the earthquake struck area.
 In 2013, IKEA has donated more than $2.6million to UNICEF to help children and families affected by Typhoon Haiyan in the Philippines.

IKEA also supports American Forests to restore forests and reduce pollution.

On 3 March 2022, IKEA announced €20million donation to UNHCR for relief support of Ukrainians who suffer from the 2022 Russian invasion of Ukraine.

IKEA donated €10 million to Doctors Without Borders for its work in Syria in response to the 2023 Turkey–Syria earthquake.

IKEA Social Initiative
In September 2005, IKEA Social Initiative was formed to manage the company's social involvement on a global level. IKEA Social Initiative is headed by Marianne Barner.

The main partners of IKEA Social Initiative are UNICEF and Save the Children.

On 23 February 2009, at the ECOSOC event in New York, UNICEF announced that IKEA Social Initiative has become the agency's largest corporate partner, with total commitments of more than US$180million (£281,079,000).

Examples of involvements:
 The IKEA Social Initiative contributes €1 (£1.73) to UNICEF and Save the Children from each soft toy sold during the holiday seasons, raising a total of €16.7million (£28.91million) so far. In 2013, an IKEA soft toy, Lufsig, created a storm and sold out in Hong Kong and in Southern China because it had been misnamed in Chinese.
 The IKEA Social Initiative provided soft toys to children in Burma after Cyclone Nargis.
 Starting in June 2009, for every Sunnan solar-powered lamp sold in IKEA stores worldwide, IKEA Social Initiative will donate one Sunnan with the help of UNICEF.
 In September 2011, the IKEA Foundation pledged to donate $62million to help Somali refugees in Kenya.
 According to The Economist, however, IKEA's charitable giving is meager, "barely a rounding error in the foundation's assets".

In 2009, Sweden's largest television station, SVT, revealed that IKEA's money—the three per cent collection from each store—does not actually go to a charitable foundation in the Netherlands, as IKEA has said. Inter IKEA is owned by a foundation in Liechtenstein, called Interogo, which has amassed $12billion (£18billion), and is controlled by the Kamprad family.

Marketing

Catalogue

IKEA used to publish an annual catalogue, first published in Swedish in 1951. It is considered to be the main marketing tool of the company, consuming 70% of its annual marketing budget. The catalogue is distributed both in stores and by mail, with most of it being produced by IKEA Communications AB in IKEA's hometown of Älmhult, Sweden. At its peak in 2016, 200million copies of the catalogue were distributed in 32 languages to more than 50 markets. In December 2020, IKEA announced that they would cease publication of both the print and digital versions of the catalogue, with the 2021 edition (released in 2020) being the final edition.

IKEA Family

In common with some other retailers, IKEA launched a loyalty card called "IKEA Family". The card is free of charge and can be used to obtain discounts on certain products found in-store. It is available worldwide. In conjunction with the card, IKEA also publishes and sells a printed quarterly magazine titled IKEA Family Live which supplements the card and catalogue. The magazine is already printed in thirteen languages and an English edition for the United Kingdom was launched in February 2007. It is expected to have a subscription of over 500,000.

IKEA Place app
On 12 September 2017, IKEA announced the augmented reality app, IKEA Place, following by Apple's release of its ARkit technology and iOS 11. IKEA Place helps consumers to visualize true to scale IKEA products into real environment.

Advertising
In 1994, IKEA ran a commercial in the United States, titled Dining Room, widely thought to be the first to feature a homosexual couple; it aired for several weeks before being pulled after calls for a boycott and a bomb threat directed at IKEA stores. Other IKEA commercials appeal to the wider LGBTQ community, one featuring a transgender woman.

In 2002, the inaugural television component of the "Unböring" campaign, titled Lamp, went on to win several awards, including a Grand Clio, Golds at the London International Awards and the ANDY Awards, and the Grand Prix at the Cannes Lions International Advertising Festival, the most prestigious awards ceremony in the advertising community.

A debate ensued between Fraser Patterson, Chief Executive of Onis, and Andrew McGuinness, partner at Beattie McGuinness Bungay (BMB), the advertising and PR agency that was awarded the £12m IKEA account. The essence of the debate was that BMB claimed to be unaware of Onis's campaign as Onis was not an advertising agency. Onis's argument was that its advertising could be seen in prominent landmarks throughout London, having been already accredited, showing concern about the impact IKEA's campaign would have on the originality of its own.  BMB and IKEA subsequently agreed to provide Onis with a feature page on the IKEA campaign site linking through to Onis's website for a period of 1 year.

In 2008, IKEA paired up with the makers of video game The Sims 2 to make a stuff pack called IKEA Home Stuff, featuring many IKEA products. It was released on 24 June 2008 in North America and 26 June 2008 in Europe. It is the second stuff pack with a major brand, the first being The Sims 2 H&M Fashion Stuff.

IKEA took over the title sponsorship of Philadelphia's annual Thanksgiving Day parade in 2008, replacing Boscov's, which filed for bankruptcy in August 2008.

In November 2008, a subway train decorated in IKEA style was introduced in Novosibirsk, Russia. Four cars were turned into a mobile showroom of the Swedish design. The redesigned train, which features colourful seats and fancy curtains, carried passengers until 6 June 2009.

In March 2010, IKEA developed an event in four important Métro stations in Paris, in which furniture collections are displayed in high-traffic spots, giving potential customers a chance to check out the brand's products. The Métro walls were also filled with prints that showcase IKEA interiors.

In September 2017, IKEA launched the "IKEA Human Catalogue" campaign, in which memory champion Yanjaa Wintersoul memorized all 328 pages of the catalogue in minute detail in just a week before its launch. To prove the legitimacy and accuracy of the campaign, live demonstrations were held at press conferences in IKEA stores across Malaysia, Singapore, Thailand as well as a Facebook Live event held at the Facebook Singapore headquarters and talk show demonstrations in the US with Steve Harvey among others. The advertising campaign was hugely successful winning numerous industry awards including the Webby award 2018 for best social media campaign, an Ogilvy award and is currently a contender for the Cannes Lions 2018.

In 2020, IKEA conducted a "Buy Back Friday" campaign with a message to present a new life to old furniture instead of offering customers to buy new items for Black Friday.

In June 2021, IKEA said it had suspended adverts on GB News because of concerns the channel's content would go against their aim to be inclusive. In a statement IKEA said: "We have safeguards in place to prevent our advertising from appearing on platforms that are not in line with our humanistic values. We are in the process of investigating how this may have occurred to ensure it won't happen again in future, and have suspended paid display advertising in the meantime."

Criticisms

IKEA has been criticized about unsustainable sourcing of wood from protected forests, certain unsafe product lines, negative effects on communities, as well as other issues.

In popular culture
IKEA stores have been featured in many works of fiction. Some examples include:

 The SCP Foundation, an online collaborative writing project documenting fictional anomalous objects, entities and events, features an entry (numbered SCP-3008) based on an IKEA store which is notably bigger on the inside than it would outwardly imply, and from which escaping is far more difficult than expected. The interior of this store is populated by entities dressed in IKEA staff attire, resembling highly deformed, faceless humanoids, which are normally passive during the "day" (when the lights are switched on) but become aggressive during the "night" (when the lights are switched off).
 A number of survival horror video games have been created based on SCP-3008.
 The Swedish crime comedy film Jönssonligan dyker upp igen features a failed robbery of the IKEA store at Kungens Kurva by the eponymous gang.
 The American film 500 Days of Summer features the main characters flirting around the showroom of an IKEA store. It was filmed on-location at an IKEA store. One of the tracks from the film's score is entitled "Ikea" to reflect the scene. 
 The novel The Extraordinary Journey of the Fakir Who Got Trapped in an Ikea Wardrobe by French author Romain Puertolas features a trip to an IKEA store in Paris, France.
 IKEA Heights, a comedic melodrama web series
 Children's picture book Bears Out of The Box by Stefan Cabo and illustrated by Lucia Mrvova. The book features IKEA's famed Fabler Bjorn doll, who is trying to venture outside the store. The book was released in 2021 by Europe Books.
 The 2014 horror comedy novel Horrorstör is set in a haunted store called ARSK, modelled on IKEA, and the novel is designed to look like the IKEA catalog.
 In 2018, the company's plush toy shark "Blåhaj" was widely used in an internet meme, with social media users posting humorous photos of it in their homes.

References

External links

 Company home page
selling furniture 

 
Furniture retailers
Mattress retailers of Sweden
Retail companies of Sweden
Retail companies of the Netherlands
Design companies of Sweden
Food and drink companies of Sweden
Food and drink companies of the Netherlands
Furniture retailers of the United States
Lighting brands
Superstores
Superstores in the United States
Multinational companies headquartered in the Netherlands
Retail companies established in 1943
Design companies established in 1943
Food and drink companies established in 1943
Manufacturing companies established in 1943
Swedish companies established in 1943
Purveyors to the Court of Sweden
Privately held companies of the Netherlands
Jardine Matheson Group
Swedish brands
Home appliance brands
Companies based in South Holland